Sweet Sunshine is a 2020 American musical drama film directed by Craig McMahon, starring John Way and Savanah D. McMahon.

Cast
 John Way as TJ Millhouse
 Savanah D. McMahon as Sunshine
 Julie Van Lith as Kat
 Mackenzie Coffman as Dakota Millhouse
 Savannah Wix as Tonya
 Rob Edwards as Hank
 Debra Ann Byrd as Hope

Reception
Jackie K. Cooper gave the film a rating of 5/10 and praised Way's performance and the soundtrack but stated that the film "looks like it was filmed on a shoestring.

Stephanie W. of Dove.org wrote that while the film "offers predominantly nice production values", some of the performances are "uneven" and several scenes "seem subtly stilted".

Tara McNara of Common Sense Media rated the film 2 stars out of 5 and wrote that while Way is "amiable and charming" and "demonstrates real talent", and the soundtrack is "surprisingly and consistently good", the quality of the audio is "poor" and script not "solid".

Alan Ng of Film Threat gave the film a score of 3/10 and wrote that while the music is "good", the production values and the acting are "relatively typical for low budget indie films" and the script is "highly predictable".

References

External links
 
 

American musical drama films
2020s musical drama films